Cawdor Barracks is a British Army installation located  east of St Davids, Pembrokeshire and  south west of Fishguard, Pembrokeshire, Wales.

It was an operational airfield between 1944 and 1992, being used by both the Royal Air Force (when it was known as RAF Brawdy) and by Royal Navy's Fleet Air Arm (RNAS Brawdy), before closing in 1992. The site was reactivated in 1995 by the British Army and became Cawdor Barracks, home to 14 Signal Regiment, the army's electronic warfare unit.

History

The Royal Air Force station at Brawdy officially opened on 2 February 1944 as a satellite station for the heavy bomber aircraft of nearby RAF St Davids.

Royal Naval Air Station Brawdy

On 1 January 1946 the station was handed over to the Fleet Air Arm of the Royal Navy and became Royal Naval Air Station (RNAS Brawdy), initially used as a Relief Landing Ground for RNAS Dale located near Milford Haven. It was commissioned as HMS Goldcrest on 4 September 1952 and in March 1953 the first Hawker Sea Hawk entered service with 806 Naval Air Squadron. From 1963 till 1971 Brawdy was home to Fairey Gannets and Hawker Hunters in the Airborne Early Warning (AEW) and advanced flying training roles respectively. The Royal Navy left in 1971 and the base was allocated to the Department of the Environment.

RAF Brawdy
In February 1974 the Royal Air Force returned to Brawdy with 'D' Flight of No. 22 Squadron taking up residence with their Westland Whirlwind HAR.10 search and rescue helicopters. In September of the same year No. 229 Operational Conversion Unit, later the Tactical Weapons Unit (TWU), relocated with the Hawker Hunters after the closure of RAF Chivenor in Devon. By the late 1970s, the TWU operated British Aerospace Hawk T1A Squadron.

Transfer to the British Army 
As part of the rationalisation of advanced and tactical weapons training, flying ceased at Brawdy on 31 August 1992. A small number of RAF personnel remained including No. 202 Squadron and their Westland Sea Kings, which eventually left in July 1994.

Brawdy was transferred to the British Army in 1995 and became Cawdor Barracks, the army's main electronic warfare base. The name originated from the local Earls of Cawdor (who owned the Stackpole Estate).

Units
Units based include:

British Army 
 Royal Corps of Signals (1st Intelligence, Surveillance and Reconnaissance Brigade)
14 Signal Regiment (Electronic Warfare)
223 Signal Squadron (Electronic Warfare)
226 Signal Squadron (Electronic Warfare)
237 Signal Squadron (Electronic Warfare)
245 Signal Squadron (Electronic Warfare)
Operations Support Squadron

Role and operations 
Cawdor Barracks is home to the 14 Signal Regiment ("14 Signals"), the British Army's electronic warfare unit. The Regiment remains on site and has a headquarters squadron and five signal squadrons, one of which is based at RAF Digby.

Future 
In November 2016, the Ministry of Defence (MOD) announced that Cawdor Barracks would close in 2024. This was later extended to 2028.

References

Citations

Bibliography

External links
Airliners.net Photo Gallery of Aircraft at RAF Brawdy
Air Britain Photo Gallery of Aircraft at RAF Brawdy
Ivor "Taff" Davies Photo Gallery of Aircraft at RAF Brawdy
Jet Photos.net Photo Gallery of Aircraft at RAF Brawdy
XE624.org – Home of the ex-RAF Brawdy Gate Guard Hunter FGA.9
United States Navy – NAVFAC Brawdy
1986 Phantom Aircrash Raf Brawdy
RAF Brawdy, Wales 1985 ~ 1987 Air Shows

Buildings and structures in Pembrokeshire
Installations of the British Army
Barracks in Wales